This article lists the complete poetic bibliography of Samuel Taylor Coleridge(1772-1834), which includes fragments not published within his lifetime, Epigrams, and titles such as The Rime of the Ancient Mariner and Kubla Khan, which contributed to his renown.

Poetry

Notes

References 

Lists of poems